Teuku Rifnu Wikana (born August 3, 1980) is an Indonesian actor of Acehnese descent. He became famous after starring in the films 9 Naga and Mendadak Dangdut in 2006. He was born in Pematangsiantar, North Sumatera.

Career
He began his career as an actor in the theater in 2004. He has starred in many films, including Mendadak Dangdut, Maaf, Saya Menghamili Istri Anda, Laskar Pelangi, Habibie & Ainun, Sang Penari, Merah Putih, Mengejar Matahari, Belenggu, and others. He starred in Negeri Tanpa Telinga with Lukman Sardi in 2014.

Filmography
 Mengejar Matahari (2004)
 9 Naga (2006)
 Mendadak Dangdut (2006)
 Maaf, Saya Menghamili Istri Anda (2007)
 Otomatis Romantis (2008)
 XL, Antara Aku, Kau dan Mak Erot (2008)
 Kado Hari Jadi (2008)
 Laskar Pelangi (2008)
 Barbi3 (2008)
 Kalau Cinta Jangan Cengeng (2009)
 Merah Putih (2009)
 Di Dasar Segalanya (2010)
 Melodi (2010)
 Merah Putih 2: Darah Garuda (2010)
 Laskar Pemimpi (2010)
 Hati Merdeka (2011)
 Sang Penari (2011)
 Kita Versus Korupsi (2012)
 Habibie & Ainun (2012)
 Gending Sriwijaya (2013)
 Leher Angsa (2013)
 Belenggu (2013)
 Jokowi (2013)
 Bukan Hanya Mata Ketiga (2013)
 Sebelum Pagi Terulang Kembali (2014)
 Negeri Tanpa Telinga (2014)
 Dilan 1990 (2018)Perempuan Tanah Jahanam (2019)''

References

External links
 Profil di Cineplex 

1980 births
Indonesian male actors
People from Pematangsiantar
Acehnese people
Indonesian people of Malay descent
Living people
Indonesian Muslims